Ivan Sergeyevich Lozenkov (born 14 April 1984) is a Russian former professional football player.

Club career
He played for the main squad of Zenit St. Petersburg in the Russian Premier League Cup.

In October 2009, he received a contusion when a fan threw a firecracker at him from the stands. Early in 2009, he played for the farm club of Zenit called Smena-Zenit and was the team's captain. Zenit fans considered him transferring to the rival Dynamo St. Petersburg team as betrayal.

References

External links
 Player page by sportbox.ru
 

1984 births
Footballers from Saint Petersburg
Living people
Russian footballers
Association football defenders
FC Zenit Saint Petersburg players
FC Arsenal Tula players
Russian Premier League players
FC Sokol Saratov players
FC Dynamo Saint Petersburg players
FC Novokuznetsk players
FC Dynamo Vologda players
FC Spartak Kostroma players
FC Tekstilshchik Ivanovo players
FC Zenit-2 Saint Petersburg players